Mark Dry (born 11 October 1987) is a British track and field athlete, competing in the hammer throw, who won bronze medals for Scotland at the 2014 and 2018 Commonwealth Games.

Career
He was born in Milton Keynes. In his earlier years he was a member of Elgin Amateur Athletics Club, where he began competing in hammer event in 2005. In his first year, he managed to come tenth in the country as an under-20 athlete. Since 2010, he represents the Woodford Green with Essex Ladies in National Championships, and predominantly competes in England or the United States. Although the top-ranked British athlete, he missed the 2013 World Championships in Athletics due to him having not achieved the B qualifying standard. UK Athletics selected him to receive support from the World Class Performance Programme for 2013-2014 because they judged him to have Olympic potential. In 2013 his seasons' best throw of 74.46m was the best achieved amongst UK men.

He has been one of the top three British hammer throwers since 2009 and in the British Championships has won a bronze medal in 2012 and silver in 2013. In the Scottish Championships he won gold in Kilmarnock in August 2014.

In May 2015, he threw a distance of 76.93m which secured him the fifth spot in the all-time UK rankings.

In May 2019 Dry was provisionally suspended from all competitions due to an Anti-Doping violation. Rule Article 2.5, under which Dry has been charged, can also include "attempting to interfere with a doping control official" or "attempting to intimidate a potential witness".

International competitions

He competed in the 2010 Commonwealth Games but did not perform well, being placed sixth with 67.41 m, some seven metres short of his best of 74.82 m. He has also competed in the 2009 European Athletics U23 Championships, but failed to live up to expectations and came eighth with a throw almost six metres off his best.

In 2014, competing for Scotland at the XX Commonwealth Games in Glasgow, Dry came third in the Men's Hammer throw finishing behind Jim Steacey (Canada) and Nicholas Miller (England).

References

External links

Living people
1987 births
People from Milton Keynes
Scottish male hammer throwers
Commonwealth Games medallists in athletics
Athletes (track and field) at the 2010 Commonwealth Games
Athletes (track and field) at the 2014 Commonwealth Games
Athletes (track and field) at the 2018 Commonwealth Games
World Athletics Championships athletes for Great Britain
Commonwealth Games bronze medallists for Scotland
Athletes (track and field) at the 2016 Summer Olympics
Olympic athletes of Great Britain
Sportspeople from Buckinghamshire
Medallists at the 2014 Commonwealth Games
Medallists at the 2018 Commonwealth Games